No. 625 Squadron RAF was a heavy bomber squadron of the Royal Air Force during the Second World War.

History
The squadron was formed on 1 October 1943 at RAF Kelstern, Lincolnshire from 'C' flight of 100 Squadron. It was equipped with Avro Lancasters, as part of No. 1 Group RAF in Bomber Command, of which it formed part between 18 October 1944 and 25 April 1945.
The squadron mainly carried out night raids against Germany. On 5 April 1945, it moved to RAF Scampton. At the end of the war, the squadron dropped food to the starving Dutch people (Operation Manna), and flew Prisoner of War repatriation flights from Belgium (Operation Exodus) and repatriated British troops from Italy, before it was disbanded on 7 October 1945.

In December 2010 the entire 625 Squadron Operational Records (ORB) and an Air Crew Roll Of Honour was compiled into a searchable database - contact www.lancaster-archive.com for more information

First operational mission

18–19 October 1943
9 Lancasters bombed Hanover

Last operational mission
25 April 1945
11 Lancasters bombed Obersalzberg

Last mission before V.E. (Victory of Europe) Day
7 May 1945
13 Lancasters dropped supplies to Dutch at Rotterdam and another Lancaster aborted

Aircraft operated

Squadron bases

The squadron memorial stands near the village of Kelstern. It was erected in 1964 and was the first to be erected to the memory of a single squadron.

Notable Members
David Mattingley, DFC
Robert Byron Pattison, DFC
Donald Fairborn DFC
Francis Aldred
William Stuart Telford, DFC
Edward Norman (Ted) Bell, Distinguished Flying Cross, Australia.
James King law

See also
List of Royal Air Force aircraft squadrons

Francis Aldred

References

Notes

Bibliography

External links
 Squadron history for nos. 621-650 sqn. at RAF Web
 625 sqn. page of RAF website
 625 Sqn Information at Lancaster-Archive.com

Bomber squadrons of the Royal Air Force in World War II
625 Squadron
Military units and formations established in 1943
Military units and formations disestablished in 1945